This page lists the winners and nominees for the British Academy Television Award for Best Comedy Performance, since its institution in 1994.

The British Academy of Film and Television Arts (BAFTA), is a British organisation that hosts annual awards shows for film, television, children's film and television, and interactive media. Since 1994 (presented in 1995), selected comedy performances have been awarded with the BAFTA award for Best Comedy Performance at an annual ceremony.

Before 1994, acting performances in comedy roles were included in the Best Light Entertainment Performance category. 

Since 2009 (presented in 2010), two separate awards have been given, Best Male Comedy Performance and Best Female Comedy Performance.

In the following lists, the first titles listed are winners, these are also in bold and in blue background; those not in bold are nominees. The year given is the year of the ceremony, for programmes made the previous year. This rule has altered slightly in recent years, for the 2011 ceremony the eligibility period was from 1 March 2010 through to 28 February 2011, while for the 2012 ceremony the eligibility period was from 1 March 2011 through to 15 February 2012.

1990s

2000s

Superlatives

Most awards won
Number of nominations in parentheses
4 : Ricky Gervais (4)
2 : Steve Coogan (4)
1 : Caroline Aherne (3)
1 : Jo Brand (2)
1 : Martin Clunes (1)
1 : Sacha Baron Cohen (1)
1 : James Corden (1)
1 : David Jason (1)
1 : Chris Langham (1)
1 : Matt Lucas (2)
1 : Joanna Lumley (4)
1 : David Mitchell (4)
1 : Dermot Morgan (1)
1 : David Walliams (2)

Notes

References

See also
 British Academy Television Awards
 British Academy Television Award for Best Comedy (Programme or Series)

External links
 BAFTA official archive (1948-2007)
 BAFTA Awards, Internet Movie Database

Comedy Performance